Ramthakur (2 February 1860 – 1 May 1949), born Ram Chandra Chakraborty, was an Indian mystic, yogi and spiritual master during 19th-century India.

References

External links

1860 births
1949 deaths
19th-century Hindu religious leaders
20th-century Hindu religious leaders
Indian Hindu yogis
Tantra
Bengali Hindu saints